Timothy George Abell (29 April 1930 – 9 March 2009) was an English cricketer and field hockey player.

The son of the cricketer George Abell, Abell was born at Lahore while his father worked as a civil servant in the British Raj. He was educated in England at Marlborough College, before undertaking studies at the University of Oxford. He played hockey for Oxford, winning a blue. He later played hockey for Middlesex and England. He made one appearance in first-class cricket for the Free Foresters in 1954 against Cambridge University at Fenner's.

His brother John Abell and great-uncle Ted Sale both played first-class cricket.

References

External links

1930 births
2009 deaths
Cricketers from Lahore
People educated at Marlborough College
Alumni of Corpus Christi College, Oxford
English male field hockey players
English cricketers
Free Foresters cricketers
Field hockey players from Lahore
English cricketers of 1946 to 1968